Beach Buggy Simulator is a video game released for the ZX Spectrum, Commodore 64 and Amstrad CPC in 1988.

Gameplay

In Beach Buggy Simulator, the players have to drive a beach buggy through several dune trials by jumping over the rocks and similar hazards, scattered along the way. The buggy is equipped with a gun for shooting down the helicopters that are passing by, trying to destroy the vehicle. The goal is to reach the finish line before the time limit runs out.

Reception

References

External links
 
 

1988 video games
Commodore 64 games
ZX Spectrum games
Amstrad CPC games
Video games developed in the United Kingdom
Telecomsoft games